Passerida is, under the Sibley-Ahlquist taxonomy, one of two parvorders contained within the suborder Passeri (standard taxonomic practice would place them at the rank of infraorder). While more recent research suggests that its sister parvorder, Corvida, is not a monophyletic grouping, the Passerida as a distinct clade are widely accepted.

Systematics and phylogeny
The Passerida quite certainly consist of the 3 major subclades outlined by Sibley & Ahlquist (1990). However, their content has been much revised. In addition, it has turned out that not all passeridan lineages neatly fit into this arrangement. The kinglets are so distinct that they might actually form a separate infraorder, as they are only slightly less basal than the Corvoidea or the Picathartidae. See Jønsson & Fjeldså (2006) for details on phylogeny.

Superfamily Sylvioidea
Mostly smallish insectivores, distribution centered on the Indo-Pacific region. Few occur in the Americas, highest diversity of families probably in subtropical East Asia and tropical Africa. Relationships of the latter are still not well-resolved as of 2019.

Includes the "Old World babblers" and "Old World warbler", two highly paraphyletic "wastebin taxa" which for long united the bulk of the thrush-sized and sparrow-sized sylvioids, respectively. Sometimes, they were even united with the muscicapoids as one huge "family" including most "songsters". Usually skulking in shrubby vegetation, many are extremely drab (most of birdwatchers' "little brown jobs" belong here) and rely on complex and often melodious vocalizations as social signals; others are less accomplished singers but produce a diversity of squeaking and twittering calls. The sexes usually look alike, though in some the males are noticeably brighter, typically with vivid yellow, green and blackish hues. Red plumage is usually due to phaeomelanins rather than carotins, and blue coloration is rarely found in this superfamily. Even in the more colorful species the plumage is usually quite cryptic in the natural habitat, but numerous have contrasting facial patterns.

 Leiothrichidae: laughingthrushes and allies
 Pellorneidae: fulvettas, ground babblers
 Timaliidae: babblers, scimitar babblers
 Zosteropidae: white-eyes
 Sylviidae: sylviid babblers
 Cettiidae: cettia bush warblers and allies
 Scotocercidae: streaked scrub warbler
 Erythrocercidae: yellow flycatchers
 Aegithalidae: bushtits
 Hyliidae: doubtfully distinct from Cettiidae; not recognised by Gill and Donsker who consider the genera Hylia and Pholidornis as Incertae sedis. 
 Phylloscopidae: leaf warblers and allies.
 Pycnonotidae: bulbuls
 Hirundinidae: swallows, martins
 Bernieridae: Madagascan warblers
 Donacobiidae: black-capped donacobius
 Locustellidae: grassbirds and allies
 Acrocephalidae: reed warblers and allies
 Pnoepygidae: cupwings
 Cisticolidae: cisticolas and allies
 Macrosphenidae: crombecs, African warblers
 Alaudidae: larks
 Panuridae: bearded reedling
 Nicatoridae: nicators

Superfamily Muscicapoidea
Generally middle-sized insectivores, with frugivory also very important; near-global distribution centered on Old World tropics. One family is endemic to the Americas, two are almost cosmopolitan, but half the families are absent or nearly so from the Americas (and Australia). Many have strong legs and are capable of running on the ground quickly. Some brightly colored (often with dark bluish hues and/or iridescence) and in such cases usually strongly sexually dimorphic; more often, however, sexes rather alike, with drab brownish plumage spotted and streaked (particularly on the underside) for camouflage. Many have highly accomplished, complex, melodious and loud songs; a considerable number is capable of sophisticated vocal mimicry.

 Cinclidae:  dippers
 Muscicapidae:  Old World flycatchers and chats. Monophyly needs confirmation.
 Turdidae:  thrushes and allies. Monophyly needs confirmation.
 Buphagidae: oxpeckers. Formerly usually included in Sturnidae.
 Sturnidae:  starlings and possibly Philippine creepers. Placement of latter in Muscicapoidea seems robust, but inclusion in Sturnidae requires confirmation; possibly distinct family Rhabdornithidae.
 Mimidae:  mockingbirds and thrashers

Superfamily Passeroidea
Mostly smallish herbivores, near-global distribution centered on Palearctic and Americas. Often pronounced sexual dimorphism with males among the most colorful birds alive. Songs tend to be fairly simple warbling and chirping, with many species relying as much or more on visual mating displays. Includes the nine-primaried oscines (probably a subclade). The basal radiation is mostly found in the Old World, with only Motacillidae naturally occurring in the Americas and Estrildidae in Australia.

The nine-primaried oscines unite most birds commonly called "sparrows" in North American and "finches" in European English, as well as a number of other mostly American groups. They are divided into the fringillid radiation which is largely restricted to the Old World, and the numerous emberizoid families of the Americas, of which in turn only Emberizidae and the Arctic circumpolar Calcariidae have reached the Old World unaided by humans. Besides these, the singular olive warbler from North to Central America apparently represents a very ancient "living fossil" passeroid; its relationships were long disputed as its outward appearance and ecology resemble Setophaga warblers, but its anatomy is in some aspects convergent or symplesiomorphic with sylvioids.

 Passeridae:  true sparrows
 Prunellidae:  accentors
 Urocynchramidae:  Przewalski's finch. Recently split from Fringillidae; tentatively placed here.
 Estrildidae:  estrildid finches (waxbills, munias, etc.)
 Ploceidae:  weavers. Certain members of Ploceidae, such as the long-tailed widowbird are well known for their elaborate sexual ornaments.
 Viduidae: indigobirds and whydahs
 Nine-primaried oscines
 Motacillidae:  wagtails and pipits
 Peucedramidae:  olive warbler
 Fringillidae:  true finches. Includes the Hawaiian honeycreepers
Emberizoidea: New World nine-primaried oscine radiation
 Icteridae:  grackles, New World blackbirds, and New World orioles
 Parulidae:  New World warblers
 Icteriidae:  yellow-breasted chat
 Phaenicophilidae: Hispaniolan tanagers
 Zeledoniidae: wrenthrush
 Teretistridae: Cuban warblers
 Thraupidae:  tanagers and allies
 Mitrospingidae:  mitrospingid tanagers and allies
 Rhodinocichlidae:  rosy thrush tanager
 Calyptophilidae:  chat-tanagers
 Nesospingidae:  Puerto Rican tanager
 Spindalidae:  spindalises
 Cardinalidae:  cardinals
 Emberizidae:  buntings
 Passerellidae:  American sparrows
 Calcariidae: snow buntings and longspurs

Passerida incertae sedis
Rather basal Passerida, most of which seem to constitute several small but distinct superfamilies. Most occur in Asia, Africa and North America.
 Possible superfamily "Dicaeoidea" – sunbirds and flowerpeckers. Small frugivores/nectarivores of the Old World tropics, typically sexually dimorphic, with bright and/or iridescent colors in males. Songs are simple chirping whistles.
 Nectariniidae:  sunbirds
 Dicaeidae:  flowerpeckers
 Possible superfamily Bombycilloidea – waxwings and allies. Mid-sized, mostly Holarctic frugivores; plumage silky and dark to greyish-brownish, with little if any sexual dimorphism. Ringing calls and usually quite vocal, but no dedicated song.
 Bombycillidae:  waxwings
 Dulidae:  palmchat. Tentatively placed here.
 Ptiliogonatidae:  silky flycatchers. Tentatively placed here.
 Hypocoliidae:  hypocolius. Tentatively placed here.
 †Mohoidae: Hawaiian honeyeaters. Tentatively placed here.
 Possible superfamily Paroidea – titmice and allies. Small, round-headed, with tiny pointed bills. Forage acrobatically among twigs, mostly eating small insects and seeds. Generally Palaearctic, ranging into the Old World tropics and North America. Little if any sexual dimorphism; may be brownish-grey or fairly bright and multicolored. In any case head plumage usually either fairly uniform and greyish, or with black markings, and/or crested. Songs usually repetitive chirped phrases.
 Paridae:  tits, chickadees and titmice
 Remizidae:  penduline tits. Sometimes included in Paridae.
 Stenostiridae: stenostirids ("flycatcher-tits"). A newly assembled family; sometimes included in Paridae.
 Possible superfamily Certhioidea (or Sittoidea) – wrens and allies. Insectivores, usually tiny. Expert climbers, most are capable of running up vertical trees or cliffs, some can even climb head-downwards. Predominantly palearctic, but two families entirely or almost so American, and one restricted to the Old World tropics. Little sexual dimorphism; plumage either greyish and fairly uniform at least on the upperside, or brown above, lighter below, and heavily streaked. Clear whistled vocalizations, usually melodic and louder than one would expect from birds of their size. Songs often complex, e.g. with social duetting, and apparently very important in species recognition.
 Sittidae:  nuthatches
 Tichodromadidae: wallcreeper. Tentatively placed here.
 Certhiidae:  treecreepers
 Troglodytidae:  wrens
 Polioptilidae:  gnatcatchers
 Possible monotypic superfamily N.N.: sugarbirds (Promeropidae).Relatives of the Australasian honeyeaters; 2 species restricted to the Cape Floral Region and mainly feeding on Proteaceae nectar and associated insects. Medium-sized, with extremely long tails; drab coloration resembling a muscicapoid, sexes almost alike. Vocalizations similar to honeyeaters; males have specialized wing feathers that produce noise during courtship flights.
 Possible monotypic superfamily N.N.: hyliotas (Hyliotidae; formerly in Sylviidae).4 species of smallish insectivorous "warblers" from tropical African woodlands. Two- or three-toned, medium grey to blackish above, more or less intense yellowish below, some species with white wing markings. Sexual dimorphism slight; whistling calls.
 Possible monotypic superfamily Reguloidea – kinglets (Regulidae).Tentatively placed here; may belong in Certhioidea. Some 5 species of tiny rotund Holarctic woodland insectivores. The smallest songbirds, and as a family the smallest living birds altogether by average length. Greenish-brownish above, dull whitish below, and with a bright yellow to red central patch on the top of the head. Rapid twittering high-pitched chirps, easier heard than seen. Unlike hummingbirds which lay only 2 eggs per clutch and can live up to a dozen years or more, kinglets are (together with some small quails) the most r-selected birds alive, with clutch sizes of around 10 eggs, a maximum lifespan of merely around 5 years even in captivity, and an annual mortality of 80%.

Probably not Passerida
These lineages have been assigned to the Passerida in recent times, often based on DNA-DNA hybridization data. However, they are probably more basal among the songbirds and would belong either to the Corvoidea or the allied basal lineages. Most of them are either African or Wallacean groups.
 Aegithinidae: ioras. Formerly in Irenidae, and may be closely related; possibly Corvoidea closely related to cuckooshrikes.
 Chloropseidae: leafbirds. Formerly in Irenidae, and may be closely related.
 Irenidae; fairy-bluebirds. Formerly in "Timaliidae" or Pycnonotidae.
 Melanocharitidae: berrypeckers and longbills. Formerly in Dicaeidae; possibly Corvoidea closely related to cuckooshrikes.
 Paramythiidae: tit berrypecker and crested berrypeckers. Formerly in Dicaeidae or Melanocharitidae; possibly Corvoidea closely related to whipbirds.
 Picathartidae: rockfowl. Formerly in "Timaliidae", but possibly close to rockjumpers (Chaetops) and sometimes considered the basal living branch of the Passerida.
 Chaetopidae: rockjumpers. Possibly close to rockfowls (Picathartes).
 Platysteiridae: wattle-eyes or puffback flycatchers. Formerly in Muscicapidae; probably Corvoidea closely related to bush-shrikes.

See also
 List of birds

References

 
 Harshman, John (2008). Passerida. Version 23 June 2008 (under construction). in The Tree of Life Web Project. Retrieved 24 January 2011.
 Sibley, Charles Gald & Ahlquist, Jon Edward (1990): Phylogeny and classification of birds. Yale University Press, New Haven, Conn.

 
Bird infraorders
Passeri